Sharuna was a settlement in ancient Egypt, located east of the Nile, almost opposite of Per Medjed. The modern village that stands at this site is called el-Kom el-Ahmar Sawaris. It is within the boundaries of the modern Al Minya Governorate.

Overview
Some of the old city's remains can be still found today. These include tombs of the late Old Kingdom, as well as the remains of a destroyed Ptolemaic temple.

See also
 List of ancient Egyptian sites, including sites of temples

Cities in ancient Egypt
Populated places in Minya Governorate
Former populated places in Egypt